Fairy King or king of the fairies may refer to:

Oberon
the Erlking (Danish elverkonge "elf-king")
Fairy King (horse)

See also
Fairies
Mythological king